The Victoria City Council is the governing body of the City of Victoria, British Columbia, Canada. 

The council consists of the mayor plus eight councillors. A deputy mayor is appointed monthly. 

The councillors are councillors-at-large elected for the entire city. 

Municipal elections are held every four years across the Province on the third Saturday of October.

The most recent election was held on October 15, 2022.

Victoria City Council members
Current (2022-2026)

2018 - 2022

References

External links
 Victoria City Council

Municipal councils in British Columbia
Politics of Victoria, British Columbia